This is a list of members of the Council of State of Luxembourg.  The Council of State has twenty-two members, although this has not always been the case.  In total, 181 appointments have been made to the Council of State, including 162 different people, as several have served more than once.

See also
 List of presidents of the Council of State of Luxembourg

References
 

Council of State of Luxembourg